The Summit League baseball tournament is the conference baseball championship of the NCAA Division I's Summit League. The top four finishers in the regular season of the conference's seven teams advance to the double-elimination tournament, which in 2023 will be at Newman Outdoor Field in Fargo, North Dakota. The winner of the tournament receives an automatic berth to the NCAA Division I Baseball Championship.

The league changed its name from the Mid-Continent Conference prior to the 2008 season.  Oral Roberts has won the most championships with 20, and is the most recent champion.

Champions

By year
The following is a list of conference champions and sites listed by year.

By school
The following is a list of conference champions listed by school.

Italics indicate that the program is no longer a member of The Summit League.

References